Diapheromeridae is a family of stick insects (order Phasmatodea). They belong to the superfamily Anareolatae of suborder Verophasmatodea.

The family contains some huge species, e.g. Paraphanocles keratosqueleton which can grow to over 30 cm long.

Subfamilies
Four subfamilies are placed here according to the Phasmid Study Group. The re-established Lonchodidae, placed as a subfamily in the Diapheromeridae in older treatments, now contain the Lonchodinae and the Necrosciinae. The Palophinae are the smallest subfamily by far and not particularly diverse. The other two subfamilies, with 3 tribes each, contain the highest diversity of Diapheromeridae.

The subfamilies are now:
 Diapheromerinae
 Palophinae

See also
 List of Diapheromeridae genera

References

External links

 AnimalBase : Diapheromeridae Family

Phasmatodea families